Kerrville-Schreiner Park is a developed recreational area on the Guadalupe River in Kerrville, Texas, United States. Originally, a Texas state park developed by the Civilian Conservation Corps (CCC) between 1935 and 1937, the state transferred the park to the City of Kerrville in 2004.

History
In 1934, the City of Kerrville donated 517 acres to the State Parks Board for development of a state park. CCC Company 1823CV arrived in January 1935 to begin construction on project SP-58. The company stayed until May 1937. CCC work at the park included building the park road, culverts, and other park infrastructure. the caretaker's dwelling, garage, a storage facility with water storage tank and entrance portals.

The park was originally called Kerrville State Park. The Texas Parks and Wildlife Department Commissioners changed the name to Kerrville-Schreiner State Park in 1990. On February 13, 2004, the park transferred back to the City of Kerrville under authority of Texas House Bill 2108.

Flora and fauna
The park is home to an abundance of wildlife including white-tailed deer and blackbuck, axis deer, rabbits, fox, birds, and butterflies.
The butterfly garden in the park is a certified monarch waystation.

References

External links

Protected areas of Kerr County, Texas
Civilian Conservation Corps in Texas
Kerrville, Texas